London Underground Ltd v National Union of Railwaymen, Maritime and Transport Staff [1996] ICR 170 is a UK labour law case, concerning the right to strike.

The case is also notable as Millett LJ stated in the course of his judgment that:

Facts
London Underground Ltd claimed an injunction from the RMT making new members support a strike after a ballot had been taken. The RMT called on members to strike and notified employers under the Trade Union and Labour Relations (Consolidation) Act 1992 section 226A it would hold a ballot, gave them a list of 5000 union members under s 234A. The ballot was 4–7 August 2000 members voted in favour, 622 against. It notified the result under s 234A, with a strike called from 25 August to 4 September. Twenty members had since joined. Mance J held the union had no statutory immunity for any inducements to the 69s members who joined after the ballot, but did not lose immunity for the whole strike. The union appealed.

Judgment
The Court of Appeal held there was full immunity. Under TULRCA 1992 s 226 a union had statutory immunity from suit for inducing any members to strike where it was supported under TULRCA 1992 ss 226–232. The strike itself had to have support of a ballot, not an individual itself taking part, so if a majority were in favour the strike was lawful and no immunity was lost for inducement of new members joining after the strike ballot.

Millett LJ said the following.

See also

United Kingdom labour law

Notes

References

United Kingdom labour case law